Thorleifs Hit Collection is a 2002 Thorleifs double compilation album. At the album charts, it peaked at 42nd position in Sweden.

The compilation was released for the band's 40th anniversary.

Track listing

CD 1
Att glömma är inte så enkelt (Vår enda sommar)
Och du tände stjärnorna
Rosor doftar alltid som mest när det skymmer
Jag dansar med en ängel
Tack, min vän
Följ mig
Flyg bort min fågel
Forever and ever
Ring en signal
Gråt inga tårar
Tre gringos (Thorleifs & Just D)
Raka rör (och ös till bäng)
Med dig vill jag leva
Älska mig
Oh Josefine, Josefine
En liten ängel

CD 2
Dina nära och kära
Gröna blad
Kurragömma
My Heart Will Go On
Halva mitt hjärta
En dag i juni (Safe in My Garden)
Swing'n Rock-medley
Krama mig igen
Skänk mig dina tankar
Genom skogar över ängar
Don't Cry for Me Argentina
Ingen får mig att längta som du
Jag vill ge dig en sång
Fem röda rosor till dig
Till Folkets Park
Liebst du mich wohl immer noch (Älskar du mig än, som förr)

Charts

References 

2002 compilation albums
Thorleifs albums
Compilation albums by Swedish artists